Gabriele Ferretti (Ancona, 31 January 1795 – Rome, 13 September 1860)  was an Italian Catholic cardinal and Camerlengo of the Sacred College of Cardinals.

Personal life
He was born into nobility, the son of Palatine Count Liverotto Ferretti and Flavia Sperelli. By birth he was Count of Castelferretti, Palatine count and a noble of Rieti and Fermo. He was also a patrician of Ancona and San Marino. He was educated at the Collegio of Parma and the Collegio Tolomei in Siena, before entering the Seminary of Ancona and attending the Collegio Romano, where he earned a doctorate in theology.

Ecclesiastical service
Ferretti was ordained to the priesthood on 1 June 1817.

He was elected bishop of Rieti in 1827. In 1833, he was promoted to the titular see of Seleucia in Isauria and was appointed nuncio in Sicily in the same year. In 1837, he was transferred to the see of Montefiascone e Corneto and later that year was again transferred, this time to the metropolitan see of Fermo.

Cardinalate
Ferretti was elevated to cardinal (in pectore) in 1838 and was revealed as a cardinal in 1839.

He resigned pastoral government of his archdiocese in 1842 and was appointed Prefect of the Sacred Consulta of Indulgences and Relics in 1843. Ferretti participated in the Papal Conclave of 1846, which elected Pope Pius IX and in the same year was appointed legate in the provinces of Urbino and Pesaro.

In the years following, he was appointed to a number of senior positions in the Catholic Church including:
Vatican Secretary of State - 1847
Secretary of Memorials - 1847
Apostolic Penitentiary - 1852 (a position he held until his death)
Camerlengo of the Sacred College of Cardinals - 1854 to 1855
Grand prior of the Equestrian Order of St. John of Jerusalem - 1858

Death
Ferretti died on 13 September 1860 in Rome. His funeral was held on 17 September 1860. Pope Pius IX (whom he had helped to elect) participated in his funeral and he was buried, according to his will, in the Capuchin church of the Santissima Concezione in Rome.

References

See also

College of Cardinals

1795 births
1860 deaths
19th-century Italian cardinals
People from Ancona
Cardinal Secretaries of State
Cardinals created by Pope Gregory XVI
Major Penitentiaries of the Apostolic Penitentiary
Archbishops of Fermo
Bishops of Montefiascone
Bishops in Lazio
19th-century Italian Roman Catholic archbishops